Kali the Mother (1900) is an English book written by Sister Nivedita. Kali is a popular Hindu goddess who is considered to free her worshippers from fear (anxiety) and all troubles. In this book Nivedita celebrated this Indian goddess Kali.

Chapters 
 Title Page
 Contents
 Concerning Symbols
 The Vision of Siva
 Two Saints of Kali
 The Voice of the Mother
 A Visit to Dukineshwar
 An Intercession
 The Story of Kali for a Western Baby
 Kali the Mother
 Works by the Swâmi Vivekânanda

References

External links 

 Full text available at Sacred Text

1900 non-fiction books
19th-century Indian books
English-language books
Books by Sister Nivedita
20th-century Indian books